3DXML is a proprietary 3D file format developed by Dassault Systemes under its 3DVIA Brand. It uses an XML container whose specifications were published. It should not be confused with X3D, the ISO standard XML-based file format for representing 3D computer graphics.

The 3DXML file is a zip archive file that contains a BOM file and one or more 3D representation files. Renaming the file from .3dxml to .zip allows a program like WinZip to open the archive.

The 3DXML file can contain 3D representation files stored in either XML or binary format and they can contain either surface data, as a mesh that can be interpreted as surface data or as a simple mesh.

The surface data is stored as Gregory patches.

The "surface" mesh (containing topology, faces, edges, vertices, and rounding weights) can be reinterpreted back into a surface by a compliant 3DXML viewer.

The simple mesh is tessellated data stored as triangles. trifans, and trisets.

Support 
Up to this date the 3DXML format is only supported by Dassault Systèmes product line. The 3D XML Player is a standalone application that allows you to view 3D XML files on Windows. The 3DVIA Player, a free player available on the Windows platform (OSX No longer supported), allows to view 3D XML files in a web browser, offline or online.

License
Dassault Systèmes provides a yearly royalty free license to anyone requesting the 3DXML format documentation. This license however only permits internal works.

See also
3DML
3DMLW
List of vector graphics markup languages
 glTF - a Khronos Group file format for 3D Scenes and models.

References

External links 
 Official website
 C++ Data Binding for 3DXML
 3DXML collaborative warehouse
 GLC_Player the Open source 3DXML (ASCII) Viewer

3D graphics file formats
XML markup languages
Vector graphics markup languages